"Come Josephine In My Flying Machine" is a popular song with music by Fred Fisher and lyrics by Alfred Bryan.

History
First published in 1910, the composition was originally recorded by Blanche Ring and was, for a time, her signature song. Ada Jones and Billy Murray recorded a duet in November 1910, which was released the following year. There have been many subsequent recordings of the pop standard.

Written in the early days of aviation, it tells of a young man courting his girlfriend by "flying machine" and expresses the technological optimism of the era: "Whoa, dear! Don't hit the moon! No, dear . . . Not yet, but soon!" (It would take until 1969 for man to reach the moon.)  It allegedly was based upon Josephine Sarah Magner (April 22, 1883 – July 15, 1966), who was perhaps the first woman parachutist in America with her initial jump in 1905. She was married to early aviation pioneer Leslie Burt Haddock (April 10, 1878 – July 4, 1919), made hundreds of jumps, and assisted Haddock in the building of the first U.S. Army dirigible (Signal Corps Dirigible Number 1) designed by her uncle Thomas Scott Baldwin.

In popular culture
The 1912 Mack Sennett comedy A Dash Through the Clouds features an aviation-obsessed woman named "Josephine", played by Mabel Normand, taking flight with real-life aviation pilot Philip Parmelee.
The song is performed in the feature film The Story of Vernon and Irene Castle (1939).
It remained popular enough into the 1940s to be featured in a "Follow the Bouncing Ball" sing-along cartoon and parodied by Spike Jones & His City Slickers.
The song was also recorded by Benay Venuta for the Broadway musical cast recording of Hazel Flagg (1953).
It was sung in a Season 8 episode of The Waltons, "The Silver Wings" (1979).
Fragments of the song are sung a cappella in the movie Titanic (1997), early on by the character Jack (Leonardo DiCaprio) to Rose and later, while awaiting rescue, by Rose (Kate Winslet); it is also featured in the deleted scene where the characters come back from the Irish party in third class, and whispered to Rose during the "I'm flying" scene.
Moya Brennan recorded the song for the film's second soundtrack, Back to Titanic (1998).
It was included as a karaoke piece in The Simpsons episode, The Man in the Blue Flannel Pants (2011), when in an attempt to stop his boss, Mr. Montgomery Burns, from ruining his party, Homer asks the DJ to play the oldest song he has. Coincidentally, the song officially became 100 years old at the time of the episode's release.
Fragments of the song were used in a cappella form in the television series Peaky Blinders (2013), season one episode two.
The lyrics of the song were used as chapter names, and a mantra and common theme through Clive Cussler's book The Race
In the season 3 episode 5 of Disenchantment, a quartet sings the chorus to Bean.

References

External links 
"Come Josephine In My Flying Machine" sheet music

1910 songs
Songs with lyrics by Alfred Bryan
Songs written by Fred Fisher
Songs about aviators
Male–female vocal duets